BC CSKA Sofia is a Bulgarian professional basketball club based in the capital Sofia and part of the CSKA Sofia sports club.

CSKA Sofia men's team have been champions of Bulgaria 12 times and Bulgarian cup winners 17 times. They played their home games at "CSKA" Hall in Sofia. In 2006–07, they took part in the FIBA EuroCup tournament.

History
The CSKA Basketball team took over the AC-23, a team which finished in the second place in the national championship in 1942. In 1946, BC "Chavdar" was formed and finished third in the championship. 

Basketball is one of the sports that developed in CSKA right from the creation of the Club on 5 May 1948. This "September in CDV" practically takes the whole male and female teams of AS-23, which proves clearly the relationship between CSKA and the first "army" Club in Bulgaria. The new team continued with the composition and the asset of CDV in the current Championship. In the autumn of the same year second place was won, and in 1949 it won the first CDV and the first in its history title in basketball. It was followed by two more titles over the next two seasons, while men generally earned 12 titles and 17 cups in the country. The founders of the Club were Konstantin Totev, Iliya Angelov, Tonko Raynov, Lubomir Katerinski, etc. Later, on the team played Konstantin Kotsev, who after his career became an artist in the National Theatre. At the time still a soldier, Daniel recited excerpts from plays in front of his teammates and he is remembered as one of the most colourful personalities in the "red" Club.

The strongest periods of men's basketball at CSKA were the 1950s and mid-' 60s and ' 70s, when they earned most titles, and in Europe basketball teams such as CSKA (Moscow), AEK (Athens), Olympiakos (Piraeus) and Huventud (Badalona) have been defeated in the european tournaments.

Thus the basketball CSKA won recognition beyond the borders of Bulgaria as well. Reaching of a semifinal in the Cup Winners ' Cup in 1975 and the quarterfinals of the European Cup in 1966 and 1968 are achieved.

In total, for the period 1948-1974 basketball bands broadcast 26 masters of sports and many of them are national team players.

Among the most famous basketball players of CSKA are Dimitar Donev, Kliment Kamenarov, Konstantin Totev, Iliya Angelov, Tonko Raynov, Georgi Maleev, Tsvyatko Barchovski, Temelaki Dimitrov, Atanas Golomeev, Petko Marinov, Milko Arabadzhiiski, Rumen Peychev and others. In CSKA famous coaches like Lubomir Katerinski, Ilia Totev, Kosyo Totev, Tsvyatko Barchovski, Omurtag Kuzmanov and Petko Marinov have worked.

In the mid-80s, on the European scene the "army men" were still performing very well, but the real criteria for success, as they were before, is playing against the big teams in front of full halls of people, which in those times CSKA definitely plays in.

After the changes made on the 10th of November, 1989, the "army" basketball gradually fell into crisis and was on the way of vanishing. The military stopped taking part in developing the sport, which hits the club quite harshly. After 1992 the club cannot manage to win gold in the championship and only wins the "Cup of Bulgaria" in 2005.

During the 2006/2007 season Emil Koen and Vladimir Fedyaev take control over CSKA. They have the ambition to get the legendary team to get up on his feet. The women's team is also recovered, as the "Red angels" make the best season in their history.

In Bulgaria the "Red Angels" won a golden double, and the biggest achievement is the winning of the prestige "Adriatic league", which is one of the most competitive tournaments in Europe. The good times don't last long because of the death of Emil Koen in 2007.

After 2007 comes the time for two very intense years in which various owners change places and in the end the basketball team ends its competitive actions.

Only in 2012 a group of enthusiasts led by Alexander Chamakov and Robert Gergov begin gradual attempts to reincarnate the red team. Because of the lack of enough financial power, they start working solely on the youth academy, but the ambition is starting from season 2016-2017 there to be a men's representative team. After several seasons in the second level in 2022 CSKA won the second division (victory against Shumen II in the final) and from the 2022-23 season returned to the NBL. The coach of the team will be the red legend Rosen Barchovski. Also from the new season CSKA will have a double team in BBL "A" Group with coach Hristo Tsenov.

Honours
  National Basketball League (12): 1949, 1950, 1951, 1965, 1967, 1977, 1980, 1983, 1984, 1990, 1991, 1992
  Bulgarian Cup (17) (record): 1953, 1955, 1962, 1963, 1973, 1974, 1977, 1978, 1981, 1984, 1985, 1989, 1990, 1991, 1992, 1994, 2005
  BBL A Group/Second League (1): 2022
 European Champions' Cup 1/4 finalists (2): 1966, 1968
 FIBA European Cup Winners' Cup 1/2 finalists (1): 1975
 FIBA European Cup Winners' Cup 1/4 finalists (2): 1974, 1976

BC CSKA Sofia in European Basketball 
FIBA European Champions Cup / FIBA European League

FIBA European Cup Winners' Cup / FIBA European Cup

FIBA Europe League / FIBA EuroCup

FIBA Korać Cup

Season by season

Players

Current roster

Notable players

  Dimitar Donev
  Kliment Kamenarov
  Georgi Maleev
  Tsvyatko Barchovski
  Temelaki Dimitrov
  Atanas Golomeev
  Petko Marinov
  Milko Arabadzhiyski
  Rumen Peychev
  Georgi Glouchkov
  Kosta Iliev
  Omorogbe Nosa
  Allan Tošić
  Trevor Harvey
  Leandro Palladino

Head coaches

  Lyubomir Katerinski
  Iliya Semov
  Kosyo Totev
  Tsvyatko Barchovski
  Omurtag Kuzmanov
  Petko Marinov
  Rosen Barchovski
 Jaacob Gino

BC CSKA Sofia II
From 2022/23 season CSKA has a second team in the BBL "A" group. Head coach is Hristo Tsenov, who led the first team in the second division of Bulgaria until the summer of 2022.

Current roster

Historical name's and years of existence 
 AC-23 (1923–1944)
 Chavdar (1944–1948)
 CSKA Sofia (1948-present)
 Septemvri pri CDV (Bulgarian: Септември при ЦДВ), September at the Central House of the Troops in 1948 and 1948/49.
 Narodna Voiska (Bulgarian: Народна Войска), People's Troops in 1950.
 C.D.N.V. (Bulgarian: Централен Дом на Народната Войска, Ц.Д.Н.В.), Central House of the People's Troops in 1951 and 1952.
 CDNA (Bulgarian: ЦДНА, Централен Дом на Народната Армия), Central House of the People's Army from 1954 and until the 1961/62 season.
 CSKA "Cherveno zname" (Bulgarian: ЦСКА „Червено знаме“), CSKA "Red Flag" between 1962/63 and 1967/68.
 CSKA "Septemvriysko zname" (Bulgarian: ЦСКА „Септемврийско знаме“), CSKA "September's flag" between 1968/69 and 1988/89.
 CSKA (Bulgarian: ЦСКА), CSKA – Central Sports Club of the Army since 1989/90.

Women's honours 
  Bulgarian Championships (1): 2007
  Bulgarian Cup (1): 2007
  Bulgarian Cup (1): 1974
  Women's Adriatic League (1): 2007
EuroCup Women 1/16 finalists (1): 2007

WBC CSKA Sofia in European Basketball 
EuroCup Women

Women's Adriatic League

External links
 Official website 

CSKA Sofia
CSKA Sofia
Military sports
Basketball teams established in 1948